Marilyn Collins is a London-based sculptor, known internationally, who has exhibited in many parts of the world.

She has several installations on display in public gardens in the UK, a notable example being the Spriggan set in a wall on the Parkland Walk, North London.

Commissions and publicly sited work

March 2001 ‘The Drop’ Water feature for a wildlife garden Priory Park, London

June 1997 ‘Ant’s Nest’ Commissioned by Stoke Newington Midsummer Festival Abney Park Cemetery

June 1995 - Artist in residence for the Community Centre Garden Chettle Court Estate (Haringey)

Jan 1996 Water feature, gate features and paving

May 1995 - Mural at Haringey Asian Action Group Haringey Arts Council Mural Project

Oct 1993 ‘Spriggan’ Parkland Walk, London

Group exhibitions

April 2006 'Eating out in the Great Outdoors' MODA, Enfield

October 2005 'Zoo-a-logical', Knapp Gallery

May 2005 ‘Grounds for Designs’ MODA, Enfield

May 2005 ‘Sculptural Possibilities’ Cupola gallery, Sheffield

July 2004 ‘Summer Art in Eden’ Eden restaurant, Harrow on the Hill

July 2004 ‘What’s That in the Woods’ Millfield Arts Centre, Edmonton

April 2004 ‘Outdoor Habitats’ Museum of Domestic Architecture, Enfield

Sept 2003 ‘Ancient Greeks and modern Europeans’ Cosmos, Paleochora, Crete

July 2003 2 Sphinxes ‘Drawn from Nature’ Exbury Gardens (Beatrice Royal gallery)

June 2003 ‘Vortex Flotilla’ The Sculpture Trail at Hebden Bridge

Oct 2001 ‘Inhabiting the Border’ Bruce Castle Museum Gallery -An exhibition I curated of artists from Vienna

July 2001 ‘Memorial – poor cow’ Cuckoo Farm, Colchester

Feb 1999 Free Formations. An exhibition of design work for communities Sutton House

Sept 1998 Wien Fluss -Sound Sculpture
– This work was part of an exhibition -Horen ist Sehen / Oir es Ver -shown internationally from
Sept 1998 and continuing.

June 1998 ‘Tourist Trap/Selbst Portrat ‘ Passage Galerie Kunstlerhaus VIENNA
Installation at 4 U-Bahn stations in Vienna

June 1997 ‘Ant’s Nest’ (Related to the Abney Park Cemetery piece) Hardcastle Craggs Sculpture Trail

July 1994 ‘Grass Knot’ ‘Eurosculpture’ Symposium – 200 sculptors working in public Carhaix Brittany

1994 ‘Sphinx’ and ‘Leaf Stele’ ‘The Mythic Garden’ Chagford

Solo exhibitions
2004 ‘Ancient Greeks and Modern Europeans’ Eden restaurant Harrow on the Hill

2003 ‘Transit’ 27, Burgasse Vienna

1997 travel documents Florians, Crouch End

1997 and Jackson's Lane

Marilyn Collins: I started exhibiting in 1985 when I was invited to have a solo show at the Swarthmore Centre in Leeds. From 1993 – 4 I worked with Gary Cromack on installations in France, Germany and London
Education
Bradford college BA 1981-1984
John Cass School of Art Foundation 1980-1981
Guest student at the Universitat fur Angewandte Kunst, Vienna 1997-1998
Creative Mentoring at Collage Arts 2003
Freeform Arts Trust NVQ3 Sept – Dec 1998
Tamil Nadu Studying traditional methods of lost wax casting Feb –
INDIA with sculptor R. Ravindren Mar 1996 Haringey Arts Council Mural Project 1994–1995
SHAPE training for artists working in community settings 1987

Recent workshops in schools and in the community
Sunnyside Gardens 8.08.2000, 8.12.2000
Cuckoo Farm Studios 29.06 2001
Sculpture trail 30.06.2001
Islington Ecology Centre 31.7.2000, 3.08.2000,
20.06 2001, 14.08.2001, 21.08.2001, 28.08.2001
The Millennium Centre, Dagenham 2.04 2002
The Surrey Institute of Art and Design 19.06.2002
Mossford Park School 18 03 2002,19.03.2002
Channing Junior School, Highgate 6.05.2003
Lammas School, Leyton 14, 15 and 16.07.2003
Hornsey High School for girls Nov – Dec 2003
Ashmount School N19 June 2004
Gable Hall School, Stanford-le-hope 15.7.2004
Kids Allowed, Ealing Family Housing 30.03.2005
Thames Sculpture Group ‘Nest Project’ June – July 2005
Five weekly workshops ending in an exhibition at the Acton Festival, and at the Royal college of Art
Elthorne regeneration festival 4.7.2005
New River Festival 11.7.2005

Beavers Community Primary School. 5-week project making sculptures for the conservation area, October - November 2005

'Wild at Art'. a six-week project with Hounslow Chinese School making sculpture and a water feature on the topic of biodiversity March - May 2006. Exhibition at Redlees Arts Centre and other sites around Hounslow.

'Art Matters' Workshops based on the work of Rodin organised by National Children's Homes with the Royal Academy. June 2006. Work to be exhibited at the Royal Academy autumn 2006

References

External links

English sculptors
Living people
Year of birth missing (living people)